Riverside Walk is a   Local Nature Reserve in Virginia Water in Surrey. It is owned by Runnymede Borough Council and managed by The Cabrera Trust Committee.

This is a woodland site along the banks of the River Bourne. The wildlife is diverse and 250 plant species have been recorded and 57 different birds. A large part of the woodland is wet, but some drier areas have oak and birch trees. Mammals include three species of deer, foxes and bats.

There is access from Cabrera Avenue.

References

Local Nature Reserves in Surrey